Milpark Education is a South African private educational institution offering business education and was established in 1997. It offers both distance learning and contact learning options, specializing mainly in distance learning. Its qualifications are accredited by the Council on Higher Education. MBA accreditation received by AMBA in 2018.

The school has campuses in Melville, Johannesburg and Claremont, Cape Town, as well as a support office in Westville in Durban.

Candidates attending Milpark Education include employed individuals, entrepreneurs and school leavers completing tertiary education.

Qualifications and courses
Milpark Education offers both contact and distance learning Higher Education (HE) and Further Education and Training (FET) qualifications as well as career-focused short programmes.
Its qualifications are offered via various schools: Business School, Investment and Banking, Financial Planning and Insurance, Commerce and Milpark College.

Milpark offers an MBA in general management, as well as a BBA in this field. It also offers a Bachelor of Commerce with several majors for specialisation. Graduates from Milpark Education receive qualifications that begin at NQF level 5 and extend to 6 and 7, and culminate in the Doctorate of Business Administration (DBA) at NQF level 10. Its qualifications are accredited by the Council on Higher Education.

Short Courses  are standardised or can be customised and occur over a three- to five-day period. Courses include Bookkeeping / Accounting, Project Management, Administration Management and Computer Skills.

The aside qualifications are available (listed according to School):

BEE status
Milpark is currently a Level Two Contributor, which is its broad-based BEE status.

Ranking

References

External links
 milpark.ac.za

Distance education institutions based in South Africa
Business schools in South Africa